Alejandro Pérez Macías (born May 27, 1975) is a Mexican football manager and former player. He was born in Mexico City. Since 2020 is the manager of Pumas Tabasco.

Pérez played in Liga MX for UNAM, Tecos UAG and Guadalajara before joining Ascenso MX side Durango in 2003.

After he retired from playing, Pérez became a football manager and assistant. He worked as assistant on Pumas CCH, UNAM, Reynosa F.C., Zacatepec Siglo XXI and Atlético Reynosa. On 2019 he was named as Atlético Reynosa manager. In June 2019, he was appointed as Alebrijes de Oaxaca manager. In December of the same year, Pérez won his first championship with Alebrijes by winning the Apertura 2019. 

In 2020 he left office in Oaxaca by mutual agreement to join the technical staff of Venados F.C. as a technical assistant. In December 2020 he was appointed as the new manager of Pumas Tabasco, the reserve team of Pumas UNAM that plays in the Liga de Expansión MX.

Honours

Manager 

Alebrijes de Oaxaca

 Ascenso MX: Apertura 2019

References

1975 births
Living people
Footballers from Mexico City
Mexican footballers
Association football defenders
Liga MX players
Ascenso MX players
Club Universidad Nacional footballers
C.D. Guadalajara footballers
Alacranes de Durango footballers
Mexican football managers
Liga Premier de México managers